Läänemaa JK is a football club based in Haapsalu, Estonia.

Players

Current squad
 As of 25 April 2018.

Statistics

League and Cup

References

Lääne County
Football clubs in Estonia
2010 establishments in Estonia